The 2017 Ivy League Baseball Championship Series was held at Yale Field, home field of the Rolfe Division champion  on May 16.  The series matched the regular season champions of each of the league's two divisions. Yale won their third championship series and claimed the Ivy League's automatic berth in the 2017 NCAA Division I baseball tournament.

Yale won the Rolfe Division while  and  tied for the Gehrig Division title with identical 12–8 records. Pennsylvania won a one-game playoff on May 7 to advance to the Championship Series.

Results
Game One

Game Two

References

Ivy League Baseball Championship Series
Tournament